Canedo is a former civil parish in the municipality of Santa Maria da Feira, Portugal. In 2013, the parish merged into the new parish Canedo, Vale e Vila Maior. It has a population of 5,782 inhabitants and a total area of 27.81 km2.

Sporting teams

Canedo Futebol Clube

References

External links

Former parishes of Santa Maria da Feira